Joseph Proctor was an actor.

Joseph Proctor may also refer to:
 Joe Proctor (born 1985), American mixed martial artist
 Joseph Proctor (academic) (died 1845), academic of the University of Cambridge

See also
 Joe Procter (1906–1989), New Zealand rugby union player
 Proctor (surname)